Atlantic and North Carolina Railroad Freight Depot was a historic freight depot located at Kinston, Lenoir County, North Carolina. It was built in 1900 by the Atlantic and North Carolina Railroad, and is a two-story Romanesque style building faced in tan brick.  It had a standing seam tin gable roof with a monitor roof and 11 freight bays.

It was listed on the National Register of Historic Places in 1989  but nevertheless was razed in 2009.

References

Railway buildings and structures on the National Register of Historic Places in North Carolina
Category:Railway freight houses on the National Register of Historic Places
Romanesque Revival architecture in North Carolina
Transport infrastructure completed in 1900
Buildings and structures in Lenoir County, North Carolina
National Register of Historic Places in Lenoir County, North Carolina